is a Japanese beach volleyball player. She competed at the 1996 Summer Olympics and the 2000 Summer Olympics.

References

External links
 

1968 births
Living people
Japanese women's beach volleyball players
Olympic beach volleyball players of Japan
Beach volleyball players at the 1996 Summer Olympics
Beach volleyball players at the 2000 Summer Olympics
People from Chigasaki, Kanagawa